Zozo is a 2005 Swedish-Lebanese drama film.

Zozo may also refer to:
 Zozo, the nickname of the town of Carrizozo, New Mexico
 Zozo, the original name of Curious George, the main character of a series of children's books of the same name
 The Zozo Sisters, a musical project formed by Linda Ronstadt and Ann Savoy, resulting in the 2006 album Adieu False Heart
 Zozo Zarpa, Greek actress
 ZOZO, a Japanese clothing brand owned by Yusaku Maezawa in 2018
 Zozotown, a retail clothing website started by Yusaku Maezawa in 2004
 Zozo Marine Stadium, a stadium in Chiba City, Japan, named after the Japanese clothing brand
 Zozo, a fictional town from the 1994 video game Final Fantasy VI

See also
 I Am Zozo, a 2012 American horror thriller film